The 1913 Campeonato Carioca, the eighth edition of that championship, kicked off on May 3, 1913 and ended on December 7, 1913. It was organized by LMSA (Liga Metropolitana de Sports Athleticos, or Metropolitan Athletic Sports League). Ten teams participated. América won the title for the 1st time. Americano, Bangu and Mangueira were relegated.

Participating teams 
In February 1913, AFRJ and LMSA reconciled, with the former being absorbed into the latter. Originally, the championship would have 13 clubs: all the LMSA teams that had disputed the previous year's championship, and the five best teams in AFRJ's championship. However, in March, the clubs voted for reducing the championship to ten teams, and Cattete, Paulistano and Germânia found themselves relegated to the Second Level; As a protest, Germânia retired from the league altogether.

System 
The tournament would be divided in two stages:
 First round: The ten teams all played against each other in a single round-robin format. The seven best teams qualified to the Second phase and the bottom three were relegated.
 Second round: The remaining six teams all played in a single round-robin format against each other. The team with the most points in the sum of both stages won the title.

Championship

First round

Second round

Final standings

References 

Campeonato Carioca seasons
Carioca